Faisal Saad Ajab Al-Azemi (born 23 January 1993) is a Kuwaiti footballer. His elder brothers are Ahmad Ajab and Khalid Ajab.

International career

International goals
Scores and results list Kuwait's goal tally first.

Personal life
Faisal brothers, Ahmad and Khalid, was also footballers.

Honours 
Qadsia
Winner
 AFC Cup: 2014
 Kuwait Emir Cup: 2014–15
 Kuwait Super Cup: 2014

Runner-up
 Kuwait Super Cup: 2015

Individual
 Kuwaiti Premier League Top Scorer: 2017–18

References

External links 
 

1993 births
Living people
Kuwaiti footballers
Kuwait international footballers
Kuwaiti expatriate footballers
Qadsia SC players
Al Tadhamon SC players
Al-Markhiya SC players
Qatari Second Division players
Association football forwards
Footballers at the 2014 Asian Games
Expatriate footballers in Qatar
Kuwaiti expatriate sportspeople in Qatar
Asian Games competitors for Kuwait
Al-Sahel SC (Kuwait) players
Al-Arabi SC (Kuwait) players
Kuwait Premier League players